TAESA Flight 725 was a scheduled flight originating in Tijuana International Airport and ending at Mexico City International Airport with intermediate stopovers in Guadalajara and Uruapan, that crashed shortly after departure from the latter city's airport on November 9, 1999, killing all 18 passengers and crew on board. The crash led TAESA to ground its fleet and suspend operations a year later in 2000.

Investigators determined that the crew did not use the appropriate checklists prior to departure, and during the climbout, the pilots were confused about which heading to follow. Spatial disorientation was also believed to be a factor in the crash.

Aircraft 
The aircraft operating the flight was an McDonnell-Douglas DC-9-31, manufactured by McDonnell-Douglas, and first entered service with Trans Australia Airlines in February 1970. It was 29 years old at the time of the accident and accumulated more than 59,000 takeoff/landing cycles and 58,000 flight hours. Before being delivered to TAESA Lineas Aéreas, it previously operated for Australian Airlines, Sunworld International Airlines, Midway Airlines, NASA and Aeroméxico.

Passengers and crew 
The captain was 36-year-old Jesús José Graciá. He had 5,368 flight hours. The first officer was 22-year-old Héctor Valdez, who had 250 flight hours at the time of the accident. 

There were 18 people on board the DC-9 at the time it crashed, with 13 passengers and 5 crew members.

Flight 
The aircraft departed Uruapan for Mexico City at 18:59 local time. All 18 people on board were killed.

In popular culture 
A  Mexican musical group named Conjunto Michoacan released, on October 20, 2010, a CD titled "La Tragedia de Taesa", but in the song's video, the flight is referred to as "Flight 715" instead. Also, the CD's cover has a photo of a Boeing 767, whereas the Taesa plane that crashed was a McDonnell Douglas DC-9-31 jet.

References

External links 
 Boeing Expresses Condolences After TAESA Accident (Archive) - Boeing
 NTSB Identification

Aviation accidents and incidents in Mexico
Accidents and incidents involving the McDonnell Douglas DC-9
1999 in Mexico
November 1999 events in Mexico
Transportation in Michoacán